NADH-ubiquinone oxidoreductase 75 kDa subunit, mitochondrial (NDUFS1) is an enzyme that in humans is encoded by the NDUFS1 gene. The encoded protein, NDUFS1, is the largest subunit of complex I, located on the inner mitochondrial membrane, and is important for mitochondrial oxidative phosphorylation. Mutations in this gene are associated with complex I deficiency.

Structure 
NDUFS1 is located on the q arm of chromosome 2 in position 33.3 and has 20 exons. The NDUFS1 gene produces a 79.5 kDa protein composed of 727 amino acids. NDUFS1, the protein encoded by this gene, is a member of the complex I 75 kDa subunit family. It contains a transit peptide, 10 turns, 19 beta strands, 27 alpha helixes, and cofactor binding sites for [2Fe-2S] and [4Fe-4S] clusters. The cluster domains consist of a 79 amino acid 2Fe-2S ferredoxin-type from positions 30–108, a 40 amino acid 4Fe-4S His(Cys)3-ligated-type from positions 108–147, and a 57 amino acid 4Fe-4S Mo/W bis-MGD-type from positions 245–301. Several transcript variants encoding different isoforms have been found for this gene.

Function 

The protein encoded by this gene belongs to the complex I 75 kDa subunit family. Mammalian complex I is composed of 45 different subunits. It locates at the mitochondrial inner membrane. This protein has NADH dehydrogenase activity and oxidoreductase activity. It transfers electrons from NADH to the respiratory chain. The immediate electron acceptor for the enzyme is believed to be ubiquinone. This protein is the largest subunit of complex I and it is a component of the iron-sulfur (IP) fragment of the enzyme. It may form part of the active site crevice where NADH is oxidized.

Clinical significance 

Mutations in the NDUFS1 gene are associated with Mitochondrial Complex I Deficiency, which is autosomal recessive. This deficiency is the most common enzymatic defect of the oxidative phosphorylation disorders. Mitochondrial complex I deficiency shows extreme genetic heterogeneity and can be caused by mutation in nuclear-encoded genes or in mitochondrial-encoded genes. There are no obvious genotype–phenotype correlations, and inference of the underlying basis from the clinical or biochemical presentation is difficult, if not impossible. However, the majority of cases are caused by mutations in nuclear-encoded genes. It causes a wide range of clinical disorders, ranging from lethal neonatal disease to adult-onset neurodegenerative disorders. Phenotypes include macrocephaly with progressive leukodystrophy, nonspecific encephalopathy, hypertrophic cardiomyopathy, myopathy, liver disease, Leigh syndrome, Leber hereditary optic neuropathy, and some forms of Parkinson disease.

Interactions 
NDUFS1 has been shown to have 124 binary protein-protein interactions including 110 co-complex interactions. NDUFS1 appears to interact with SOAT1, NDUFA9, HLA-B, ECE2, C1QTNF9, GPAA1, STOM, GDI1, ACAP2, EHBP1, MBOAT7, PIGS.

See also 

 NDUFS2

References

Further reading

External links 
 

Human proteins
EC 1.6.5